"Boomers" is the name used for two groups of settlers in the Southern United States in what is now the state of Oklahoma.

The first group were participants in the "Boomer Movement." These participants were white settlers from 1879–1889 who believed the so-called "Unassigned Lands" within the Indian Territory were public property and open to anyone for settlement, not just Indian tribes. Their belief was based on a clause in the Homestead Act of 1862 which said that any settler could claim  of "public land."  

The land was said to be public because it had been set aside for Indian reservations, yet the allotment for some tribes was reduced as a result of allying with the Confederacy during the Civil War and the Reconstruction Treaties that followed.  The name "Boomer" came from figuratively making noise and raising hell for their claims.  Some Boomers entered the Unassigned Lands and were removed more than once by the Army on the Frontier. Charles C. Carpenter was the earliest leader of the Boomer movement, but was eventually succeeded by David L. Payne. Payne helped grow the movement by founding the Southwestern Colonization Company, which served to organize the movement. After his death, Payne was succeeded by William L. Couch.

President Grover Cleveland opened the Indian Territory to settlement by signing the Indian Appropriations Act of 1889 on March 2, 1889.  The result was the Land Rush of 1889.  In it, rushers could be divided into two groups: the Sooners were settlers who entered the Unassigned Lands just prior to the April 22, 1889 official opening in a race to grab the best land, while the ones who waited until the actual opening date are also sometimes referred to as "Boomers", confusingly.

After its founding in 1890, the University of Oklahoma adopted "Boomers" as the nickname of their football team, after having first tried "Rough Riders." In 1908, the name was changed to "Sooners", the current team name.  Their fight song is "Boomer Sooner". The OU "mascot" is the Sooner Schooner, a Conestoga wagon that crosses the field when the University of Oklahoma football team scores. It is pulled by a pair of ponies named "Boomer" and "Sooner". There are a pair of costumed mascots also named "Boomer" and "Sooner".

References

External links
 
 Oklahoma Digital Maps: Digital Collections of Oklahoma and Indian Territory

Pre-statehood history of Oklahoma
Oklahoma culture
History of agriculture in the United States
American regional nicknames
Agriculture in Oklahoma